Alburnoides is a genus of cyprinid fishes native to Europe and Asia. Many species are known as riffle minnows or spirlins.

Species
There are currently 30 recognized species in this genus:
 Alburnoides bipunctatus (Bloch, 1782)
 Alburnoides coadi Mousavi-Sabet, Vatandoust & Doadrio, 2015  (Coad's riffle minnow)
 Alburnoides damghani Roudbar, Eagderi, Esmaeili, Coad & Bogutskaya, 2016 (Damghan riffle minnow) 
 Alburnoides devolli Bogutskaya, Zupančič & Naseka, 2010
 Alburnoides diclensis Turan, Bektaş, Kaya & Bayçelebi, 2016 
 Alburnoides eichwaldii (De Filippi, 1863)
 Alburnoides emineae Turan, Kaya, Ekmekçi & Doğan, 2014  (Beyazsu chub)
 Alburnoides fangfangae Bogutskaya, Zupančič & Naseka, 2010
 Alburnoides fasciatus (Nordmann, 1840) (Transcaucasian spirlin)
 Alburnoides gmelini Bogutskaya & Coad, 2009
 Alburnoides holciki Coad & Bogutskaya, 2012 
 Alburnoides idignensis Bogutskaya & Coad, 2009
 Alburnoides kubanicus Bănărescu, 1964
 Alburnoides maculatus (Kessler, 1859)
 Alburnoides manyasensis Turan, Ekmekçi, Kaya & Güçlü, 2013  (Manyas spirlin)
 Alburnoides namaki Bogutskaya & Coad, 2009
 Alburnoides nicolausi Bogutskaya & Coad, 2009
 Alburnoides oblongus Bulgakov, 1923 (Tashkent riffle bleak)
 Alburnoides ohridanus (S. L. Karaman, 1928) (Ohrid spirlin)
 Alburnoides parhami Mousavi-Sabet, Vatandoust & Doadrio, 2015  (Parham's riffle minnow)
 Alburnoides petrubanarescui Bogutskaya & Coad, 2009
 Alburnoides prespensis (S. L. Karaman, 1924) (Prespa spirlin)
 Alburnoides qanati Coad & Bogutskaya, 2009
 Alburnoides recepi Turan, Kaya, Ekmekçi & Doğan, 2014  (Recep's chub)
 Alburnoides rossicus L. S. Berg, 1924 
 Alburnoides samiii Mousavi-Sabet, Vatandoust & Doadrio, 2015  (Samii's riffle minnow)
 Alburnoides tabarestanensis Mousavi-Sabet, Anvarifar & Azizi, 2015  (Tabarestan riffle minnow)
 Alburnoides taeniatus (Kessler, 1874) (Striped bystranka)
 Alburnoides varentsovi Bogutskaya & Coad, 2009
 Alburnoides velioglui Turan, Kaya, Ekmekçi & Doğan, 2014  (Velioglu's chub)

References

 
Taxa named by Ludwig Heinrich Jeitteles
Taxonomy articles created by Polbot